Miklós Lendvai (7 April 1975 – 20 February 2023) was a Hungarian professional footballer who played as a defensive midfielder.

Playing career
Lendvai played for several Nemzeti Bajnokság I clubs such as Zalaegerszegi, Ferencváros, and Győri ETO FC. He also played for the French side Bordeaux and the Swiss side FC Lugano. He spent several years in Belgium playing for K.F.C. Verbroedering Geel, K.F.C. Germinal Beerschot and R. Charleroi S.C. He also played in Cyprus for Aris Limassol. Finally, he returned to Hungary and played for clubs in lower divisions.

Managerial career
Lendvai managed Andráshida SC, Zalaegerszegi TE, and Hévíz FC.

In 2014, he was appointed as the manager of Zalaegerszeg, after the resignation of Emil Lőrincz. On 5 April 2015, he criticized heavily his own players after losing a Nemzeti Bajnokság II match against Siófok.

In 2016, he resigned as the manager of Hévíz, although he won the Megyei Bajnokság I with the club.

Personal life and death
Lendvai was married and had five children.

In 2018, it was revealed that he ended his managerial career and that he was working as a construction worker. In 2021, it was reported by Nemzeti Sport that Lendvai was not interested in football anymore.

Lendvai died on 20 February 2023, at the age of 47. The cause of his death has not been confirmed by the police, but according to press reports, he committed suicide. His former teammate at Ferencváros, Ottó Vincze, said goodbye on his Instagram profile by saying "Why did he do it?" On 24 February 2023, it was revealed that he committed suicide.

On 25 February 2023, Ricardo Moniz, manager of Zalaegerszeg, paid tribute to Lendvai by beating Fehérvár in the 2022-23 Nemzeti Bajnokság I season.

On 26 February 2023, fans of R. Charleroi S.C. paid tribute to Lendvai with a huge drapery on the 27 matchday of the 2022–23 Belgian Pro League match against Sint-Truidense V.V..

References

External links
 

1975 births
2023 deaths
2023 suicides
People from Zalaegerszeg
Sportspeople from Zala County
Hungarian footballers
Association football midfielders
Hungary international footballers
Hungary under-21 international footballers
Olympic footballers of Hungary
Footballers at the 1996 Summer Olympics
Nemzeti Bajnokság I players
Ligue 1 players
Belgian Pro League players
Cypriot First Division players
Zalaegerszegi TE players
FC Girondins de Bordeaux players
FC Lugano players
Ferencvárosi TC footballers
K.F.C. Verbroedering Geel players
Beerschot A.C. players
Fehérvár FC players
R. Charleroi S.C. players
Aris Limassol FC players
Győri ETO FC players
Hungarian football managers
Zalaegerszegi TE managers
Hungarian expatriate footballers
Hungarian expatriate sportspeople in France
Expatriate footballers in France
Hungarian expatriate sportspeople in Switzerland
Expatriate footballers in Switzerland
Hungarian expatriate sportspeople in Belgium
Expatriate footballers in Belgium
Hungarian expatriate sportspeople in Cyprus
Expatriate footballers in Cyprus